Iderlindo Moreno Freire (born 13 February 1985) is a Dutch footballer who currently plays for C.D. Santa Clara.

Club career
Moreno Freire is a midfielder of Cape Verde Islands ancestry, who was born in Rotterdam and made his debut in professional football, being part of the Sparta Rotterdam squad in the 2003-04 season.

In the summer of 2009 he left Sparta and signed with Portuguese side FC Penafiel, as the club was relegated in addition to their financial difficulties, so the player joined FC Dordrecht in the Dutch Eerste Divisie on a free transfer in January 2010.

Iderlindo last competitive fixture played for RBC Roosendaal v FC Dordrecht in a 3-2 win on 6 May 2011.

Iderlindo suffered a fracture of the leg in 2011, the healing process was delayed due to fluid within the bone undiagnosed. The player made a full recovery late in 2012.

Late in the 2012/13 season Iderlindo signed for Segunda Liga club C.D. Santa Clara in Portugal.

On 18 May 2013 Iderlindo made his debut v Benfica B, the game was tied 2-2.

Iderlindo is the cousin of Red Bulls Salzburg Captain David Mendes Da Silva.

External links
 Player profile - Sparta Rotterdam
 Career stats - Voetbal International 

1985 births
Living people
Footballers from Rotterdam
Dutch sportspeople of Cape Verdean descent
Dutch footballers
Dutch expatriate footballers
Sparta Rotterdam players
FC Dordrecht players
F.C. Penafiel players
Eredivisie players
Eerste Divisie players
Expatriate footballers in Portugal
Association football midfielders